El Mafrex (born Mfreke Obong Ibanga; 14 May 1984) is a Nigerian-born, urban gospel singer-songwriter, based in Edinburgh, Scotland.

He was nominated for Best Gospel Act consecutively at the 2012 and 2013 editions of the (MOBO) Music of Black Origin Awards. He won Artiste of the year and Urban Recording of the year at the 2012 Scottish New Music Awards, making him the first black man to win the SNMA.

His song, "Jehovah", which features Christian rock band Royal Foundlings had more than 500,000 hits in the first five months of its release on YouTube. He released "That Man from Galilee" in the first quarter of 2013, which debuted at no 49 on the iTunes UK Chart for Gospel and had over a million hits on YouTube in its first 6 months.

On 30 September 2012, he was featured in the Sunday Mail.

He was nominated for the Season 8 of The Future Awards Africa on 10 July 2013.

Early life and education 
He was born in Nigeria and educated at the Nigerian Military School in Zaria, Kaduna State.

He graduated in 2006 from the University of Uyo, Akwa Ibom State, where he studied physics and majored in electronics. In 2010, he obtained a master's degree in information-systems development from the Edinburgh Napier University.

Career

In 2001, El Mafrex started a boy band, M.O.D. (Men of Destiny), and was the lead vocalist of the five-man group. The band toured and played shows in Nigeria, especially in its south-south region before later expanding from a boy band to a family project. The family project gave birth to the Destiny Kids and MOD dancers.

While in the University of Uyo, he formed another boy band, Da Grooves, made up of Louis and GeePee. Together they played gigs on campus and its environs.

At the end of 2004, he left the band to start his own solo career, which he called the "el MAFREX" project. He was voted Artiste of the year in 2005 by the SUG of University of Uyo, and his songs "Rhythm in the Air" and "Esio Mkpo" were played on radio and television stations in Nigeria. "Rhythm in the Air" won song of the month, on the then Cosmo FM Enugu.

On 21 December 2013, el Mafrex headlined the Sixth edition of the Akwa Ibom State Government Christmas Carol (9999 Carol SIngers) night with other International gospel artists like Israel Houghton, South African gospel legend Lionel Peterson and Nigerian Gospel acts like Frank Edwards, Aity Dennis, Freke' and Nathaniel Bassey. He led a Reggae praise session in the Guinness book of world records listed event at the Uyo Township Stadium.

STV interview 
In November 2012, he was interviewed by Scottish television news STV, where he talked about his music and recent MOBO Awards nomination.

Business interest 
El Mafrex has other interests besides music as he prepares to launch his own line of designers eyeglasses. He told The Scotsman that he had his own personal sunglasses customized specially for himself and has since received compliments from many people who are interested in acquiring them, which has propelled him towards the direction of having a line for his sunglasses. The name of the line would be 3:16 derived from the Bible verse, John 3:16.

Singles

Awards and nominations

See also

 List of Christian hip hop and rap artists
 List of Nigerian gospel musicians
 List of Edinburgh people
 List of gospel musicians
 List of Nigerians
 List of R&B musicians
 List of reggae musicians
 List of Scottish musicians
 List of singer-songwriters
 Music of Nigeria
 Music of Scotland

References

External links
 

Living people
1984 births
21st-century Black British male singers
21st-century Nigerian male singers
Alumni of Edinburgh Napier University
British gospel singers
Black British male rappers
British performers of Christian hip hop music
British reggae musicians
British contemporary R&B singers
Nigerian hip hop singers
Nigerian expatriates in Scotland
Nigerian singer-songwriters
Nigerian Military School alumni
Scottish singer-songwriters
Urban contemporary gospel musicians
University of Uyo alumni
21st-century Scottish male singers
British male singer-songwriters